NGC 1073 is a barred spiral galaxy in the constellation Cetus.  The galaxy is estimated to be about 55 million light years from Earth, possess a disk spanning an estimated 80,000 light years in diameter, and likely contains a type of active core, called an HII nucleus.
 
NGC 1073 is similar to the Milky Way only in their shared possession of a galactic bar. NGC 1073, however, does not possess the well-defined symmetrical arm structure the Milky Way exhibits, and retains a central bar larger than our home galaxy's. NGC 1073 can be viewed with a mid-sized telescope in rural, dark skies.

References

External links

Video (01:18)

Barred spiral galaxies
Cetus (constellation)
1073
02210
10329